Baltazara Chuiza was a woman, who together with her sister Manuela Chuiza, led a rebellion in Ecuador against the Spanish taxes in 1778.

References 

Year of birth missing
Year of death missing
Ecuadorian rebels
Indigenous rebellions against the Spanish Empire
Women in 18th-century warfare
Women in war in South America
18th-century Ecuadorian people